The 1999 Women's EuroHockey Nations Championship was the fifth edition of the women's field hockey championship organised by the European Hockey Federation. It was held in Cologne, Germany from August 18 to August 29, 1999. In the final the defending champion Netherlands defeated Germany to clinch its fourth title, and qualified for the 2000 Summer Olympics in Sydney, Australia.

Venue
KTHC Stadion Rot-Weiss

Squads

Umpires

 Jean Buchanan
 Jane Nockolds
 Mary Power
 Dawn Henning
 Lynne Fotheringham
 Heike Malina
 Renée Cohen
 Ute Conen
 Jean Duncan
 Alyson Dale
 Isabel Kluyskens
 Gina Spitaleri

Preliminary round

Group A

Wednesday August 18, 1999

Thursday August 19, 1999

Friday August 20, 1999

Sunday August 22, 1999

Monday August 23, 1999

Tuesday August 24, 1999

Wednesday August 25, 1999

Group B

Wednesday August 18, 1999

Thursday August 19, 1999

Friday August 20, 1999

Saturday August 21, 1999

Monday August 23, 1999

Tuesday August 24, 1999

Wednesday August 25, 1999

Play-offs
Friday August 27, 1999

Saturday August 28, 1999

Sunday August 29, 1999

Awards

References
 EuroHockey Statistics

Women's EuroHockey Nations Championship
EuroHockey Nations Championship
EuroHockey Nations Championship
International women's field hockey competitions hosted by Germany
Sports competitions in Cologne
21st century in North Rhine-Westphalia
EuroHockey Nations Championship
EuroHockey Nations Championship
1999